The 1936 BYU Cougars football team was an American football team that represented Brigham Young University (BYU) as a member of the Rocky Mountain Conference (RMC) during the 1936 college football season. In their ninth and final season under head coach G. Ott Romney, the Cougars compiled an overall record of 4–5 with a mark of 4–4 against conference opponents, finished sixth in the RMC, scored 123 points, and allowed opponents to score 123 points.

Schedule

References

BYU
BYU Cougars football seasons
BYU Cougars football